"This" is a song co-written and recorded by American country music artist Darius Rucker. It was released in November 2010 as the second single from his album Charleston, SC 1966, and the sixth solo single release of his career. It reached number-one on the U.S. Billboard Hot Country Songs chart in April 2011.  Rucker wrote this song with his producer Frank Rogers and Kara DioGuardi.

Critical reception
Sarah Rodman of the Boston Globe wrote that the song "falls squarely in the country pop sweet spot". Country Weekly reviewer Jessica Phillips said that it was "an accurate reflection" of Rucker's role as husband and father.

Karlie Justus of Engine 145 gave the song a thumbs-down, saying that it seemed too thematically similar to "Alright" and had "throwaway lyrics".

Music video
The music video was directed by Trey Fanjoy and premiered in early 2011.

Chart performance

Year-end charts

Certifications

References

2010 singles
2010 songs
Darius Rucker songs
Songs written by Darius Rucker
Songs written by Kara DioGuardi
Songs written by Frank Rogers (record producer)
Song recordings produced by Frank Rogers (record producer)
Music videos directed by Trey Fanjoy
Capitol Records Nashville singles